Jean-Pierre Pincemin (1944–2005) was a French painter and printmaker.

Main exhibitions 
2022: “Jean-Pierre Pincemin. Sculpture - Painting", Orangery of the Museums of Sens.

2019: Stéphane-Mallarmé Museum, Vulaines-sur-Seine.

2017: Univer Gallery/Colette Colla, Paris.

2016: Orangery of the Museums of Sens.

1944 births
2005 deaths
20th-century French painters
20th-century French male artists
French male painters
21st-century French painters
21st-century French male artists
Painters from Paris
20th-century French printmakers